The following lists the number one singles on the Australian Singles Chart during the 1950s.

The source for this decade is the "Kent Music Report". These charts were calculated in the 1990s in retrospect, by David Kent, using archival data.

Note: during the 1950s, often more than one version of a particular song by different artists charted at the same time, thus more than one artist may be listed for a song. Different versions are separated by a semi-colon.

Note The decade's best charting single was The Harry Lime Theme by Anton Karas, although it only peaked at #3 in the Single charts.

1950

1951

1952

1953

1954

1955

1956

1957

1958

1959

See also
Music of Australia
Lists of UK Singles Chart number ones
List of UK Singles Chart number ones of the 1950s
List of Billboard number-one singles
1950 in music
1951 in music
1952 in music
1953 in music
1954 in music
1955 in music
1956 in music
1957 in music
1958 in music
1959 in music

References
 charts sourced from David Kent's Australian Chart Book: based on the Kent Music Report
Australian Record Industry Association (ARIA) official site
OzNet Music Chart

1950s
Number-one singles
Australia